Daniel Nathan Osherson (born 1949) is an American psychologist and the Henry R. Luce Professor of Psychology at Princeton University.

References

External links
Osherson's faculty page
Osherson's CV

Living people
1949 births
21st-century American psychologists
Princeton University faculty
University of Chicago alumni
University of Pennsylvania alumni
20th-century American psychologists